Dimitrie Cornea (1816–1884) was the Minister of Justice during the Barbu Catargiu cabinet, from 22 January to 24 June 1862, and Minister of Foreign Affairs from 4 April 1876 until 26 April 1876 during the existence of United Principalities.

References

1816 births
1884 deaths
Romanian Ministers of Foreign Affairs
Romanian Ministers of Justice